The 1999 Fresno State Bulldogs football team represented California State University, Fresno as a member of the Western Athletic Conference (WAC) during the 1999 NCAA Division I-A football season. Led by third-year head coach Pat Hill, the Bulldogs compiled an overall record of 8–5 with a mark of 5–2 in conference play, sharing the WAC title with Hawaii and 1999 TCU Horned Frogs football team. Fresno State was invited to the Las Vegas Bowl, where they lost to Utah. The Bulldogs played their home games at Bulldog Stadium in Fresno, California.

Schedule

Roster

References

Fresno State
Fresno State Bulldogs football seasons
Western Athletic Conference football champion seasons
Fresno State Bulldogs football